The IAI Searcher (also known by the Hebrew name מרומית Meyromit - "Marsh tern", or officially in Israel as the חוגלה Hugla - "Alectoris") is a reconnaissance UAV developed in Israel in the 1980s. In the following decade, it replaced the IMI Mastiff and IAI Scout UAVs then in service with the Israeli Army.

Design

The Searcher looks almost identical to the Scout and Pioneer, but is in fact scaled up and is well over twice the size of the Scout. The Searcher is powered by a  piston engine. The new design features updated avionics and sensor systems with greater flight endurance as well as increased redundancy for improved survivability. In addition to Israel, the system had been exported and is or was in use by Singapore and Turkey, as well as Thailand, Russia, India, South Korea, and Sri Lanka.

Operational deployment
More than 100 Searcher IIs are being operated by the Indian Air Force and the Indian Navy.

It took part in the large-scale Russian-Belarusian exercise Zapad in September 2021.

On March 13, 2022, the Russian Ministry of Defence released video of the use of the updated Russian version in Ukraine.

Crashes 

10 June 2002 – Searcher Mark-II, operated by Indian Air Force for reconnaissance, was shot down by a Pakistan Air Force F-16B using AIM-9L Sidewinder at an altitude of 13,000 ft, after it was spotted by the mobile observation units.

11 July 2018 – A Russian "Forpost" UAV was found on 12 July in a field close to the village of Barqah, about 12 kilometres from the Israeli side of the Golan Heights (Syria) but none of the belligerents claimed the shot-down nor the loss.

On 11 March 2022, a Russian "Forpost" UAV  was shot down in Zhitomir Oblast.

Operators

 Canadian Security Intelligence Service

The fully domestic version Forpost-R made its first flight in late August 2019. 10 Forpost-R systems were ordered. Deliveries of the modified UCAVs with reconnaissance and strike capabilities started in 2020. Russia has decided to continue domestic production of the Forpost-R.
 (retired; replaced by IAI Heron-1 in 2011)

Specifications

Searcher II MK3

Forpost-R
The Forpost-R is the designation for the Russian developed UCAV based on the IAI Searcher. In 2008, Russia had approached Israel to import drones following the Russo-Georgian War, with Israel refusing to provide armed drones, an agreement was made to provide IAI Searchers MKII.

According to a YouTube video and information published by the Russian Ministry of Defense on March 13, 2022, Russian armed forces have used an armed version of the Forpost-R Unmanned Aerial Vehicle (UAV) to destroy a multiple launch rocket system from the Ukrainian army from an altitude of 3,000 m using guided missiles.

Armaments (Forpost-R)
 X-BPLA anti tank missile

See also

References

This article contains material that originally came from the web article Unmanned Aerial Vehicles by Greg Goebel, which exists in the Public Domain.

Searcher
1980s Israeli military reconnaissance aircraft
Single-engined pusher aircraft
Twin-boom aircraft
Unmanned military aircraft of Russia